St. Helena Island is a Sea Island in Beaufort County, South Carolina, United States. The island is connected to Beaufort by U.S. Highway 21. It is included as part of the Hilton Head Island-Beaufort Micropolitan Area. The island is renowned for its rural Lowcountry character and being a major center of African-American Gullah culture and language. It is considered to be the geographic influence behind the children's television program Gullah Gullah Island.

History
The first European to explore St. Helena was most likely Spanish explorer Lucas Vázquez de Ayllón around 1520, as part of the Spanish exploration and colonization of the sea islands.  Deepwater Santa Elena was established as the center of the area, and at one time was the capital of the entire Spanish colony of La Florida. The area was later colonized by the French, then recolonized by the Spanish, and finally fell into English hands, who occupied it until the American Revolution.  In the War of 1812, Saint Helena saw some British naval presence.

The area was noted to be similar to the rice growing region of West Africa and soon captured slaves were brought to the Sea Islands, many from what is today Sierra Leone. Rice, indigo, cotton and spices were grown by these slaves, as well as Native Americans, and indentured servants from Europe. The mix of cultures, somewhat isolated from the mainland, produced the Gullah culture.

The Civil War began when South Carolina fired on Fort Sumter on April 12, 1861. After a number of setbacks for the Union, the Battle of Port Royal became an important victory on November 7, 1861. Lincoln had called for a blockade of Confederate ports and Port Royal was considered one of the most important. A flotilla of Union ships commanded by Samuel F. Du Pont launched a furious assault on the forts which defended Beaufort.  After several hours, the islands fell into Union hands and were held throughout the war.

Slaves were liberated and immediate steps were taken to help improve their lot. One of the most important was the establishment of the Penn School to educate them. Another was grants of land to heads of households, from whence came the belief among the slaves that upon emancipation, all would be given forty acres (16 hectares) and a mule.

The Negro spiritual "Michael Row the Boat Ashore" originated on Saint Helena Island in the 1860s. Leigh Richmond Miner photographed the island. A book of his photographs of the island was published in 1970.

St. Helena Island was significantly impacted by the Sea Islands Hurricane of 1893, killing hundreds of residents on the island.  The economic destruction of the hurricane lingered for decades after the event, causing St. Helena Island to be one of the poorest locations in the United States for many years.

In the last decades of the 20th century, the improving economy in Beaufort coupled with resort development on nearby Fripp Island, Harbor Island and Dataw Island began to improve economic prospects for the island but also introduced development pressures that threatened the island's rural character.  In order to stem the tide of gentrification, significant planning efforts have led to restrictive development regulations to ensure the island retains its rural character and preserves its cultural and historic resources.  Condominium communities and gated communities are not allowed on St. Helena Island. Some rural land has been preserved through conservation easements and much of the island is still owned by African-Americans, much of it through heirs property arrangements.

The Indian Hill Site and Knights of Wise Men Lodge are listed on the National Register of Historic Places.

Geography
St. Helena Island is considered an inland Sea Island and does not have actual frontage on the Atlantic Ocean.  The island is surrounded by expansive marshes, particularly along the southeastern side of the island.  It is the largest Sea Island in the Beaufort area and is the largest island between Edisto Island and Hilton Head Island along the South Carolina coast.  The island is informally divided into several different communities, each with its own distinct identity.  The two most established communities on the island are Frogmore and Lands End.

 Frogmore is considered to be the commercial center of island activity and is located in the north central portion of the island.  For many years, Frogmore was the official name for the entirety of St. Helena Island by the U.S. Postal Service, and many on the island still refer to it as such. However, it is no longer the official U.S. Postal Service location name. It is officially Saint (St.) Helena, Island, S.C.
 Lands End (sometimes referred to as Fort Fremont) is a small community at the southern tip of the island which is home to Fort Fremont, a former military battery which helped guard the entrance to the Beaufort River.  The community is popular for its access to open water, thus making it a hub for fishing and recreational opportunities.

Other communities on the island are typically referred to by the road, point, or smaller island on which they are situated, including Dulamo Road, Cedar Grove, Eddings Point, Coffin Point, Fripp Point, Folly Road, Warsaw Island, and Pollawana Road, to name a few.  Three main roads provide arterial access for much of the island: Sea Islands Parkway (U.S. Highway 21), Seaside Road, and Lands End Road.

Ancestry

Education
St. Helena has a public library, a branch of the Beaufort County Library.

St. Helena is served by the Beaufort County School District. St. Helena Elementary School is the only public school located in St. Helena. Older students are zoned for Lady's Island Middle School and Beaufort High School.

Notable people
Sam Doyle, folk artist
Candice Glover, singer, American Idol season 12 winner
Marquetta Goodwine, Queen Quet, Chieftess of the Gullah/Geechee Nation
Leon Keyserling, economist, lawyer, head of Council of Economic Advisers
Ron Parker, safety for the Kansas City Chiefs
Michael F. Rivers Sr. House Representative 
Devin Taylor, defensive end for the Detroit Lions

See also
Frogmore Stew

References

St. Helena Island: Census Tract 11, Beaufort County, South Carolina United States Census Bureau.

External links
The Penn Center

 
Islands of Beaufort County, South Carolina
Islands of South Carolina
History of South Carolina
Barrier islands of South Carolina
Gullah country
Gullah culture
Hilton Head Island–Beaufort micropolitan area
Sierra Leonean-American history
Populated coastal places in South Carolina